Coşkun Taş (born 23 April 1935) is a Turkish former international footballer who participated at the 1954 FIFA World Cup. Taş, a striker, played club football in Turkey and Germany for Aydinspor, Beşiktaş, 1. FC Köln and Bonner SC. He was the first Turkish footballer at FC Köln.

References

External links
 

1935 births
Living people
Turkish footballers
Turkey international footballers
1954 FIFA World Cup players
Beşiktaş J.K. footballers
People from Aydın
Association football forwards